Nystiellidae is a family of small sea snails, marine gastropod mollusks within the superfamily Epitonioidea which includes the wentletraps, the purple snails and their allies.

This family was previously considered as a subfamily of Epitoniidae. It was raised to family status by Nützel in 1998

Genera
Genera within the family Nystiellidae include: 
 Eccliseogyra Dall, 1892
 Iphitus Jeffreys, 1883
 Murdochella Jeffreys, 1883
 Narrimania Taviani, 1984
 Opaliopsis Thiele, 1928
 Papuliscala de Boury, 1911
Genera brought into synonymy 
 Abyssiscala de Boury, 1911: synonym of  Eccliseogyra Dall, 1892
 Iphitella Thiele, 1925 : synonym of Iphitus Jeffreys, 1883
 Pustuliscala de Boury, 1921 : synonym of Papuliscala de Boury, 1911
 Sculptifer Beu & Climo, 1974 : synonym of Iphitus Jeffreys, 1883
 Solutiscala de Boury, 1909 : synonym of Eccliseogyra Dall, 1892
 Stylotrochus Seguenza, 1876: synonym of Iphitus Jeffreys, 1883

References

External links
 Museum of New Zealand info
  S. Lima & M. Christofferson, Nystiellidae (Gastropoda: Epitonioidea) Collected During the REVIZEE Program/Northeast Brazil with Descriptions of New Species and a Checklist of the Family from the Atlantic Coast of South America; American Malacological Bulletin, 31(2):289-296. 2013